The following page lists major power stations in the Czech Republic. As of 31 December 2009, power stations in Czech Republic have an installed electrical generating capacity of 18,326 MWe; of these 3,830 MWe in nuclear plants, 11,655 MWe in other thermal plants, 2,183 MWe in hydro plants, 193 MWe in wind power plants and 465 MWe in solar plants. Because of generous feed-in tariff solar plants boomed in 2010, reaching 1,394 MWe as of December 1, 2010.

Nuclear

Thermal 
 
This is a list of power stations with a capacity greater than 100 MW.

Hydroelectric 
 
This is a list of power stations with a capacity greater than 15 MW.

Solar and wind

See also 

 Energy in the Czech Republic
 List of largest power stations in the world

References

External links 
 CEZ Group Maps of Power Plants
 Alpiq Kladno thermal power station

Czech Republic
Power stations in the Czech Republic
Power stations